Blue gum is a common name for subspecies or the species in Eucalyptus globulus complex, and also a number of other species of Eucalyptus in Australia. In Queensland it usually refers to Eucalyptus tereticornis, which is known elsewhere as forest red gum.

E. globulus 
 Tasmanian blue gum: Eucalyptus globulus (syn. E. globulus subsp. globulus)
Gippsland blue gum: Eucalyptus pseudoglobulus (syn. E. globulus subsp. pseudoglobulus)
 Spotted blue gum: Eucalyptus maidenii (syn. E. globulus subsp. maidenii)
Southern blue gum: Eucalyptus bicostata (syn. Victorian blue gum or E. globulus subsp. bicostata)

Other Eucalyptus spp. 
Inland blue gum: E. leucoxylon
 Large-fruited blue gum: E. leucoxylon
 Mountain blue gum: E. cypellocarpa, E. deanei
 Round-leaved blue gum: E. deanei
 South Australian blue gum: E. leucoxylon
 Sydney blue gum: E. saligna
Other species, such as shining gum (E. nitens), and the Sydney blue gum (E. notabilis), are sometimes regarded as blue gums
Historically, the Dictionary of Australian Words also mentions E. botryoides, E. diversicolor, E. goniocalyx and E. viminalis (the famous "manna gum") in its list of "blue gum" species.

References